The fifth season of Black-ish began airing on October 16, 2018, on ABC in the United States. It is produced by Khalabo Ink Society, Cinema Gypsy Productions, Artists First and ABC Studios, with creator Kenya Barris, who also serves as executive producer alongside Anthony Anderson, Brian Dobbins, Jonathan Groff and Helen Sugland.

The series revolves around Dre, portrayed by Anthony Anderson, a family man who struggles with finding his cultural identity while raising his kids in a white neighborhood with his wife, Bow (Tracee Ellis Ross).


Cast

Main cast
 Anthony Anderson as Andre "Dre" Johnson
 Tracee Ellis Ross as Rainbow "Bow" Johnson
 Marcus Scribner as Andre ("Junior") Johnson Jr.
 Miles Brown as Jack Johnson
 Marsai Martin as Diane Johnson
 Peter Mackenzie as Leslie Stevens
 Deon Cole as Charlie Telphy
 Jenifer Lewis as Ruby Johnson

Recurring cast
 Laurence Fishburne as Earl "Pops" Johnson
 Yara Shahidi as Zoey Johnson
 Jeff Meacham as Josh Oppenhol
 Nicole Sullivan as Janine
 Wanda Sykes as Daphne Lido
 Nelson Franklin as Connor Stevens
 Allen Maldonado as Curtis
 Quvenzhané Wallis as Kyra
 Jennie Pierson as Ms. Davis
 Emerson Min as Mason
 Dara Reneé as Stunts

Guest cast
 Rob Huebel as Gary
 Anna Deavere Smith as Alicia
 Kellee Stewart as Angela Taylor
 Annelise Grace as Megan
 Kurt Fuller as Police Officer
 Andrew Daly as Dr. Evan Windsor
 Jet Jurgensmeyer as Caleb
 P.J. Byrne as Mr. Solomon
 Jessica Tuck as Dr. Cole
 Michael Strahan as June Bug
 Octavia Spencer as herself
 Brittany Daniel as Blair
 Nancy Lenehan as Barbara Piermont
 Katt Williams as Perry
 Raven-Symoné as Rhonda Johnson
 Laila Ali as herself
 Eric Nenninger as Ryan Simmons
 Michael Beasley as Al Kebble
 Quavo as himself
 Andy Richter as Hospital Patient
 Francia Raisa as Ana Torres

Episodes

On May 2, 2019, it was announced that the episode set to air May 7, 2019 titled "Becoming Bow" would be shelved until next season, given the series order of the second spin off, "Mixed-ish". The episode was to introduce a younger version of the character Bow living with her family.

Reception

Ratings

References

2018 American television seasons
2019 American television seasons
Black-ish